Thea Musgrave CBE (born 27 May 1928) is a Scottish composer of opera and classical music. She has lived in the United States since 1972.

Biography
Born in Barnton, Edinburgh, Musgrave was educated at Moreton Hall School, a boarding independent school for girls near the market town of Oswestry in Shropshire, followed by the University of Edinburgh, and in Paris as a pupil of Nadia Boulanger from 1950 to 1954.  In 1958 she attended the Tanglewood Festival and studied with Aaron Copland.  In 1970 she became Guest Professor at the University of California, Santa Barbara, a position which confirmed her increasing involvement with the musical life of the United States.  She married American violist and opera conductor Peter Mark in 1971.  From 1987 to 2002 she was Distinguished Professor at Queens College, City University of New York.

Among Musgrave's earlier orchestral works, the Concerto for Orchestra of 1967 and the Concerto for Horn of 1971 display the composer's ongoing fascination with ‘dramatic-abstract’ musical ideas.  More recent works continue the idea though sometimes in a more programmatic way: such as the oboe concerto Helios of 1994, in which the soloist represents the Sun God. Another frequent source of inspiration is the visual arts – The Seasons took its initial inspiration from a visit to New York's Metropolitan Museum of Art, while Turbulent Landscapes (commissioned by the Boston Symphony Orchestra and premiered by them in 2003) depicts a series of paintings by J. M. W. Turner.

She has written more than a dozen operas and other music theatre works, many taking a historical figure as their central character, among them Mary, Queen of Scots (1977), Harriet Tubman (Harriet, the Woman called Moses, 1984), Simón Bolívar (1993; premiere 1995 at the Virginia Opera) and Pontalba (2003). In 2008, her 80th birthday was marked by premieres of Points of View, Green, Cantilena, Taking Turns and other performances.

In 2018, coinciding with Musgrave's 90th birthday, her compositions were performed at the Edinburgh International Festival and the BBC Proms.

Reflections on a musical career 
In response to a question presented by Tom Service for the BBC about Musgrave's view of being a ‘woman composer’ she replied, "Yes I am a woman, and I am a composer. But rarely at the same time". She admits that pursuing music can be a difficult career. When asked by the BBC to offer advice to young composers, she replied, "Don’t do it, unless you have to. And if you do, enjoy every minute of it."

Honours and awards
 Musgrave has received the Koussevitzky Award (1974) as well as two Guggenheim Fellowships (1974/5 and 1982/3).  
 She holds honorary degrees from Old Dominion University (Virginia), Glasgow University, Smith College, the New England Conservatory of Music in Boston, and the Royal Conservatoire of Scotland.
 In 2002 she was appointed a Commander of the Order of the British Empire (CBE) in the Queen's New Year Honours List.
 She was awarded the Queen's Medal for Music, 2017.

Works

Major works
Chamber Concerto No 2 (1966; chamber ensemble)
Night Music (1968; for chamber orchestra – J.W. Chester/Edition Wilhelm Hansen London Ltd.)
 Concerto for Orchestra (1967; orchestra)
 Clarinet Concerto (1969; clarinet, orchestra)
 Concerto for Horn (1971; horn, orchestra)
 Viola Concerto (1973; viola, orchestra)
Rorate Coeli (1973; choir)
 Orfeo (1975; solo flute & tape or strings)
 Pierrot (1985; clarinet, violin and piano)
 Song of the Enchanter (1990; orchestra) (commissioned to honour the 125th anniversary of the birth of Jean Sibelius)  
 Helios (1994; oboe, orchestra)
 Journey through a Japanese landscape (1994; marimba, winds, harp, piano, percussion)
Songs for a Winter’s Evening (1995; soprano, orchestra)
Phoenix Rising (1997, orchestra)
 Aurora (1999; string orchestra)
 Ring Out Wild Bells (2000; clarinet, violin, cello, piano)
 The Mocking-Bird (2000; baritone, orchestra)
 Turbulent Landscapes (2003; orchestra)
 Wood, Metal and Skin (2004; percussion, orchestra)
 Two's Company (2005; oboe, percussion, orchestra)
 Voices of Power and Protest (2006; choir)
 Night Windows (2007; oboe, piano - 2016; oboe, strings)
 Points of View (2007; orchestra)
 Cantilena (2008; oboe quartet)
 Green (2008; string chamber orchestra - 2014; string orchestra)
 Poets in Love (2009; tenor, baritone, piano four hands)
 Ithaca (2010; choir)
 Towards the Blue (2010; clarinet, orchestra)
 Five Songs for Spring (2011; baritone & piano or baritone & orchestra)
 Loch Ness - A postcard from Scotland (2012; orchestra)
 The Voices of Our Ancestors (2014; choir, brass, organ)
 La vida es Sueño (2016; baritone , piano)
 From Darkness into the Light (2017; cello, orchestra)
 Missa Brevis (2017; choir, organ)

Operas
The Abbot of Drimock (1955)
Marko the Miser (1962)
The Decision (1965)
The Voice of Ariadne (1973)
Mary, Queen of Scots (1977) - also chamber version (2016)
A Christmas Carol (1979)
An Occurrence at Owl Creek Bridge (1981)
Harriet, the Woman Called Moses (1985) - also version for small orchestra re-titled The Story of Harriet Tubman (1990)
Simón Bolívar (1995) - also chamber version (2013)
Pontalba (2003)

References

External links
Official webpage; accessed 5 February 2017
Thea Musgrave profile, chesternovello.com; accessed 5 February 2017
Interview with Thea Musgrave, March 21, 1988; accessed 5 February 2017

20th-century classical composers
21st-century classical composers
Scottish classical composers
Scottish opera composers
Commanders of the Order of the British Empire
Honorary Members of the Royal Academy of Music
British expatriates in the United States
Alumni of the University of Edinburgh
People educated at Moreton Hall School
Musicians from Edinburgh
1928 births
Living people
Pupils of Aaron Copland
British women in electronic music
20th-century American women musicians
20th-century British composers
21st-century British composers
21st-century American women musicians
British women classical composers
20th-century women composers
21st-century women composers
Women opera composers